Isabel Ferreres Navarro (born 8 October 1998) is a Spanish professional racing cyclist, who most recently rode for UCI Women's Continental Team .

References

External links

1998 births
Living people
Spanish female cyclists
Place of birth missing (living people)